Shams-i-Jahan (شمس جہان) was Khan of Mughlistan from 1399 to 1408.

Family
He was the son of Khizr Khoja. Two of his daughters were married to grandsons of the Central Asian conqueror Timur: Husn Nigar Khanika to Ulugh Beg and Mihr Nigar Khanika to his brother, Muhammad Juki.

Succession

References

15th-century Mongol rulers
Chagatai khans